Slaughter and the Dogs are an English punk rock band formed in 1975 in Wythenshawe, Manchester. Their original line-up consisted of singer Wayne Barrett McGrath, rhythm guitar Mick Rossi, drummer Brian "Mad Muffet" Grantham, lead guitarist Mike Day and bassist Howard Bates.

History 
Slaughter and the Dogs were founded in 1975. The band name is a mix of Slaughter on 10th Avenue and Diamond Dogs; the band had previously been called Wayne Barrett and the Mime Troupe. They were one of the first punk rock bands in North West England, and they supported the Sex Pistols at their gig at Manchester Lesser Free Trade Hall on 20 July 1976. This concert, more than any other single event, spawned Manchester's punk scene, which was concentrated around the Electric Circus Club.

The band befriended Rob Gretton, who went on to manage Joy Division, and with his financial help, became the first band to release a single on Manchester's independent record label Rabid Records. This debut single, "Cranked Up Really High", was released in June 1977 and was listed in Mojos list of the top 100 punk rock singles of all time. It was also included on Streets, which has been described as an "essential" compilation album of early UK punk bands from a variety of independent record labels.

Wayne Barrett rejoined Slaughter and the Dogs (including Mick Rossi and new drummer Phil Rowland, formerly of Eater).

Slaughter and the Dogs released the Beware Of... studio album in October 2001 on Captain Oi! Records.

In 2015, the band announced a one-off 40th anniversary show, "Back to the Start", featuring the original line-up of Barrett, Rossi, Bates and Grantham. Held at the Ruby Lounge in Manchester on 9 October 2015.
In August 2016, the same original line up of Barrett, Rossi, Bates and Grantham performed together again at the Rebellion Music Festival in Blackpool, United Kingdom.
In 2016, the band recorded the album Vicious in Los Angeles with a new rhythm section of Mark Reback (drums) and Dan Graziano (bass) and subsequently toured Japan in May 2016 and Europe in February and March 2017. It was released by Cleopatra Records on 16 September 2016 to rave reviews, including a 9-out-of-10 rating by Vive Le Rock magazine. Cleopatra issued a live album, Tokyo Dogs, in 2017.

On 9 February 2017, Slaughter and the Dogs embarked on a seven-week European tour, playing 33 shows in 10 countries.

On 5 August 2018, Slaughter and the Dogs headlined the Rebellion Festival in Blackpool, England. and then embarked on a two-week UK tour.

In July 2019, Barrett announced on the band's Facebook page that he had fired the band,and that he intended to form a new line-up.

Reviews 
 "A more consistent songwriting approach might have lengthened the Dogs' run, though their lack of airs ensured a winning team for a time. Any band cited by the disparate likes of New Order, the Stone Roses and Smiths' frontman Morrissey surely deserves another look".
 "More often mentioned for the big name connections rather than their actual music, Slaughter & the Dogs nevertheless remain one of the key players in the early punk scene."
 "Opinion on Slaughter is divided; glam chancers or punk? Who cares! What can't be denied is their songs are full of style, speed and tunes which coincided with punk and the Pistols. They deserved more but that's music for you ... Check 'em out on Don Letts 'Punk Movie' doing Cranked Up Really High."
 "Cranked Up Really High, Where Have All the Bootboys Gone? and You're Ready Now ... [are] their enduring punk classics."
 "Slaughter played with a rare conviction and power, soul-stirring napalm guitars that laid the groundwork for an entire generation of future punk minimalists."

Discography

Studio albums 
 Do It Dog Style (Decca Records, SKL 5292, May 1978)
 Bite Back (abbreviated to Slaughter) (DJM Records, March 1980)
 Shocking (Receiver Records, May 1991)
 Beware Of... (Captain Oi! Records, October 2001)
 Vicious (Cleopatra Records, 16 September 2016)
 Il Tradimento Silenzioso (Contra Records Europe & Spaghetty Town Records USA) 2022

Singles 
 "Cranked Up Really High" / "The Bitch" (Rabid Records, June 1977)
 "Where Have All the Boot Boys Gone?" / "You're a Bore" (Decca Records, September 1977)
 "Dame to Blame" / "Johnny T" (Decca Records, November 1977)
 "Quick Joey Small" / "Come on Back" (Decca Records, February 1978)
 "It's Alright" / "Edgar Allan Poe" / "Twist and Turn" / "UFO" (TJM Records, March 1979)
 "You're Ready Now" / "Runaway" (DJM Records, November 1979)
 "I Believe" / "It Isn't Me" as Studio Sweethearts (DJM Records, June 1979)
 "East Side of Town" / "One by One" abbreviated to Slaughter (DJM Records, February 1980)
 "I'm the One" / "What's Wrong Boy?" (Live) / "Hell in New York"(DJM Records, June 1980)
 Half Alive E.P. ("Twist and Turn" / "Cranked Up Really High" / "Where Have All the Boot Boys Gone?") (Thrush Records, February 1983)
 "Where Have All the Boot Boys Gone?" / "You're a Bore" / "Johnny T" (Damaged Goods, 1988)
 "Saturday Night Till Sunday Morning" (TKO Records, 2001)
 "Situations" / "Quick Joey Small" (Brass City Boss Sounds, 2015)
 "Manchester Boys" / "Where Have All The Boot Boys Gone" (Blighty Records, Nov 2020)

Live albums 
 Live Slaughter Rabid Dogs (Rabid Records, December 1978)
 Live at the Factory (Thrush Records, 1981)
 Where Have All the Boot Boys Gone? (Receiver Records, March 1994)
 Live in Blackpool 1996 (Dodgy Items, 1997)
 Barking Up the Right Tree (Amsterdamned, 1998)
 Tokyo Dogs (Cleopatra Records, 2017)

Compilation albums 
 The Way We Were (Thrush Records, 1983)
 The Slaughterhouse Tapes (Link Records, 1989) – studio outtakes, demos, and live recordings
 Cranked Up Really High (Captain Oi! Records, 1995)
 The Punk Singles Collection (Captain Oi! Records, 2000)
 We Don't Care: Anthology (Castle Music, 2002)
 Best of Slaughter & the Dogs (Taang Records, 2002)
 A Dog Day Afternoon (TKO Records, 2003)

Compilation appearances 
 "Runaway" and "Boston Babies" on Live at the Roxy WC2 (Harvest Records, June 1977) No. 24 UK Albums Chart
 "Cranked Up Really High" on Streets (Beggars Banquet Records, 1977)
 "Where Have All the Bootboys Gone?" ("Cranked Up Really High" on later CD pressings) on the Oi! The Album (EMI, 1980)
 "Cranked Up Really High" on the limited-edition box set of North by North West: Liverpool & Manchester from Punk to Post-Punk & Beyond 1976–1984 (Korova, 2006)
 "Run Rudolph Run" on Punk Rock Christmas (Cleopatra Records, 2015)

See also 
 List of British punk bands
 List of musicians in the first wave of punk music

References

Books

External links 
 
 Slaughter & the Dogs on punk77.co.uk
 Slaughter & the Dogs on Punkmodpop
 Interview with band member

English punk rock groups
Musical groups from Manchester